Noel S. Baker is a Canadian film and television screenwriter. He is most noted for the 1996 film Hard Core Logo, for which he was a Genie Award nominee for Best Adapted Screenplay at the 17th Genie Awards in 1996, and won the prize for Best Canadian Screenplay at the 1996 Vancouver International Film Festival.

The following year he published the book Hard Core Roadshow: A Screenwriter's Diary, his own diaries of his experiences working on the film.

His other credits have included the films Platinum and American Whiskey Bar, and episodes of the television series Drop the Beat, Show Me Yours and At the Hotel.

References

External links

20th-century Canadian screenwriters
21st-century Canadian screenwriters
20th-century Canadian non-fiction writers
Canadian male screenwriters
Canadian male non-fiction writers
Canadian diarists
Canadian television writers
Living people
Year of birth missing (living people)